WQBA (1140 AM) is a radio station broadcasting a Spanish talk/sports format. Licensed to Miami, Florida, United States, the station is owned by Latino Media Network; under a local marketing agreement, it is operated by former owner TelevisaUnivision's Uforia Audio Network with programming from TUDN Radio. Previous call letters were WMIE, owned by Susquehanna Broadcasting.

1140 AM is a United States and Mexican clear-channel frequency on which XEMR-AM in Apodaca, Nuevo León and WRVA in Richmond, Virginia are the Class A stations.  WQBA must reduce power and use a highly directional array during nighttime hours in order to prevent interference to the skywave signals of the Class A stations.

History
In 1976, The Miami Herald stated that the station, which ran a news program presented by Emilio Milián, had the largest audience of any in the Miami metropolitan area.

On December 20, 2016, Univision announced that WQBA would be one of the charter affiliates of Univision Deportes Radio, their new Spanish-language sports network launched in April 2017.

WQBA was one of eighteen radio stations that TelevisaUnivision sold to Latino Media Network in a $60 million deal announced in June 2022, approved by the Federal Communications Commission (FCC) that November, and completed in January 2023. Under the terms of the deal, Univision agreed to continue programming the station for up to one year under a local marketing agreement.

References

External links
1140 WQBA's website

FCC History Cards for WQBA

Cuban-American culture in Miami
Hispanic and Latino American culture in Miami
QBA
Talk radio stations in the United States
Sports radio stations in the United States
QBA
Univision Radio Network stations
1952 establishments in Florida
Radio stations established in 1952